Bhiksha (bhikṣā; , bhikkhā) is a term used in Indic religions, such as Jainism, Buddhism and Hinduism, to refer to the act of alms or asking. Commonly, it is also used to refer to food obtained by asking for alms.

Buddhism

In Buddhism, bhiksha takes on the form of the monastic almsround (piṇḍacāra), during which monks make themselves available to the laity to receive alms food (piṇḍapāta).

Hinduism

Bhiksha signifies a Hindu tradition of asking for alms with the purpose of self-effacement or ego-conquering. Other forms of giving and asking include dakshina (offering a gift to the guru) and dāna (an unreciprocated gift to someone in need).

Usually, bhiksha is the meal served to a sadhu sanyasi or monk when that person visits a devout Hindu household. Occasionally, bhiksha has also referred to donations of gold, cattle, and even land, given to Brahmins in exchange for karmakanda. It is given by disciples to a guru as an offering as well.

Bhiksha is incorporated into religious rituals as well, a prominent one being the bhikshacharanam, which includes begging for alms. In such a ritual, a Brahmin who has completed his rite of passage ceremony must beg for alms, stating, "". 

The concept of a deity or being seeking bhiksha occurs in Hindu literature such as the Ramayana. In this epic, in order to lure Sita out of her hermitage, Ravana disguises himself as a mendicant begging for alms. When she subsequently offers him bhiksha, he abducts her to Lanka upon his pushpaka vimana.

See also
Dāna

References

Hindu monasticism
Hindu traditions
Religious food and drink
Alms in Hinduism